Piotr Darmochwał (born 19 June 1991) is a Polish footballer who plays as a midfielder for Igros Krasnobród.

Club career
Darmochwał started his career in his hometown club Tomasovia Tomaszów Lubelski. In 2007, he moved to Promień Opalenica. Progressing through their youth level, he made his first-team debut at the age of 17 in a match against Mieszko Gniezno on 28 March 2009. Ahead of 2009–10 season, he joined II liga club Okocimski KS Brzesko on loan. In the 2011-12 season, he made 28 appearances, scoring 8 goals, helping the team to gain promotion to I liga. He spent on loan four-and-a-half seasons with Okocimski, before returning to Promień Opalenica.

In January 2014, Darmochwał signed a one-year contract with I liga side Stomil Olsztyn. He made his debut for Stomil on 7 March 2014, in an away league match against ROW Rybnik, scoring in a 2–0 win. During his one-year spell at Stomil, he scored 9 goals in 35 league appearances.

In December 2014, Darmochwał signed a two-year contract with Wisła Płock. A year later, he joined Olimpia Grudziądz on loan until the end of 2015–16 season. In July 2016, he moved to Wisła Puławy, where he played for two years, scoring 3 goals in 38 matches.

On 6 July 2018, Darmochwał signed a contract with Motor Lublin. On 5 March 2019, he was loaned to Avia Świdnik until the end of the 2018–19 season.

References

External links
 

1991 births
Okocimski KS Brzesko players
OKS Stomil Olsztyn players
Wisła Płock players
Olimpia Grudziądz players
Motor Lublin players
Avia Świdnik players
Association football midfielders
Living people
Tomasovia Tomaszów Lubelski players
Wisła Puławy players
II liga players
Polish footballers